Ras Ekow Minano is a Ghanaian Rastafarian singer, drummer, songwriter and leader of the Hope of Africa Band. He was born in Accra and currently lives in Port Adelaide, South Australia. In 2020, he released his third album, Real Rasta following on from previous albums Jah Spirit and Africa is Sick. His song Africa Oseeyeii won "Reggae/World Music Song of the Year" at the W.A.M. Awards in 2020. The song also made Minano a semi-finalist in 2020 International Songwriting Contest. In February 2021, Minano released the 3-track EP Womba, the title of which translates to "We are coming" in English. He has released one album and three EPs since 2009. The music of Ras Minano & the Hope of Africa Band combines elements of afrobeat and reggae music and promotes peace, love, harmony and unity.

References 

Ghanaian musicians
Year of birth missing (living people)
Living people